Caroline Aparecida Nogueira Martins (born 21 January 1992) is a Brazilian handball player who plays for Fredrikstad BK.

References

1992 births
Living people
Brazilian female handball players
Expatriate handball players
Brazilian expatriate sportspeople in Norway
Handball players at the 2010 Summer Youth Olympics
Handball players from São Paulo